Ian Geoffrey Fraser  (born 7 September 1948) is a New Zealand broadcaster and personality. He was the chief executive officer of Television New Zealand from 2002 until 2005.

Biography 
Fraser was born in Dunedin on 7 September 1948. He was educated at Otago Boys' High School, and went on to study modern languages at the University of Otago, graduating with a Bachelor of Arts degree. A pianist, he received an associate diploma (ATCL) from Trinity College London in 1963.

Fraser decided to pursue acting and at age 22 moved to Wellington to do so. He performed in plays at Downstage and in 1973 he was part of forming Playmarket, the New Zealand agent for playwrights alongside Nonnita Rees, Judy Russell and Robert Lord. During this time Fraser worked as a journalist, wrote reviews of plays and was also the executive officer of the QEII Arts Council, the New Zealand arts funding body (now Creative New Zealand).

He started his broadcasting career as an anchor at Radio New Zealand working on the news programme Checkpoint. Fraser became well-known in New Zealand as a television interviewer, working on current affairs shows from 1974 until 1984. He then moved to public relations, becoming the chairman of Consultus and fronting a series of advertisements for the Bank of New Zealand. After heading projects for New Zealand Expo in Brisbane and Seville, Fraser became chief executive of the New Zealand Symphony Orchestra.

He moved to Television New Zealand (TVNZ) in April 2002 into the role of Chief Executive Officer. During his time in this office, TVNZ made a transition from a wholly commercial broadcaster to a public company operating under a charter.

He resigned on 30 October 2005 following a dispute with the TVNZ board over the salary negotiations of the top presenters. The board insisted it take over negotiations of salary packages over $300,000. Fraser refused.

Fraser criticised TVNZ's board in December 2005 during a finance and expenditure select committee enquiry, and was accused of serious misconduct and stripped of his remaining duties by the board as a result. In February 2006, he threatened legal action over the misconduct claim and TVNZ withdrew the censure.

In the 1990 Queen's Birthday Honours, Fraser was appointed an Officer of the Order of the British Empire, for public services.

Film and television credits 
 2015: Breathing is Singing – Research – Film 
 2010: Lest We Forget – Presenter – Television
 2010: 50 Years of New Zealand Television: 1 – From One Channel to One Hundred – Subject – Television
 2005: 50 Ways of Saying Fabulous – As: Referee – Film
 1997: The Gong Show – Judge – Television
 1996: Revolution – 2, The Grand Illusion – Presenter – Television
 1996: Revolution – 4, The New Country – Presenter – Television
 1996: Revolution – 1, Fortress New Zealand – Presenter – Television
 1996: Revolution – 3, The Great Divide – Presenter – Television
 1996–1998: Showcase – Presenter – Television
 1996: Showcase – 1996 Grand Final – Presenter – Television
 1996: Showcase – 1996 Viewers' Final – Presenter – Television
 1994–1998: Fraser – Presenter – Television
 1993: Counterpoint - Presenter – Television
 1992: The Party's Over - Subject – Television
 1991: Logan Brewer – The Man Behind the Razmatazz - Subject – Television
 1990: Living Treasures - Presenter, Executive Producer – Television
 1990: Living Treasures – Friedensreich Hundertwasser – Interviewer, Executive Producer – Television
 1988: Fourth Estate – Final Episode - Subject – Television
 1988–1994: Frontline - Presenter – Television
 1984: Sunday - Presenter – Television
 1983: Kaleidoscope – Bruce Mason 1921–1982 - Subject – Television
 1983: Kaleidoscope – Decade of the Enz - Reporter – Television
 1983: Ashkenazy in Concert - Interviewer – Television
 1982: Newsmakers – David Frost - Presenter – Television
 1979–1983: Newsmakers - Presenter – Television
 1979: The Ray Woolf Show – Christmas Special - Pianist – Television
 1977: Will the Real Mr Claus Please Stand Up - Guest – Television
 1977–1980: Dateline Monday - Presenter – Television
 1976: Houses Built on Sand - Reporter – Television
 1975–1977: Seven Days - Reporter – Television
 1974–1976: Nationwide - Reporter – Television

Personal life 
Fraser married Suzanne Snively in 1975, and the couple went on to have three children. Sniveley is an economist and managing director of strategic and economic advice company, MoreMedia Enterprises.

See also
 List of New Zealand television personalities

References

1948 births
Living people
New Zealand television presenters
Mass media people from Dunedin
University of Otago alumni
New Zealand Officers of the Order of the British Empire
New Zealand Symphony Orchestra people
People educated at Otago Boys' High School
New Zealand chief executives